The 2019 Villa Nueva mayoral election will be held on 16 June 2019.

The elections will be held next to the presidential, legislative, municipal and Central American Parliament elections.

The current mayor Edwin Escobar Hill, elected by the extinct Renewed Democratic Liberty, does not run for re-election, because he is running as a presidential candidate.

Results

References

Elections in Guatemala